The Grand Bazaar (in Persian: Bazar Bozorg, بازار بزرگ)  is a historical market located in Isfahan, Iran, also known as the Qeysarriyeh Bazaar (in Persian: بازار قيصريه), Qeysarie bazaar or Soltani bazaar. The main commercial activities in the Qeysarie bazaar are carpet and kilim selling.

The bazaar was one of the greatest and luxurious trading center in the safavid era. It was built in 1620 on the northern side of Naqsh-e Jahan Square. It connects the Naqsh-e Jahan Square to the Kohneh Square and seljukid part of Isfahan.

The Qeysarie bazaar includes these parts:
 Orian bazaar
 Harounie
 Nimavard-e Golshan
 Makhlas
 Samavarsazha (Samovarmakers)
 Maqsudbeyk

In the Qeysarie bazaar, there are many historical buildings such as Nimavar school, Sadr school, Khayyatha mosque, No mosque, Zolfaghar mosque, Shishe mosque and Jarchi mosque. The Qeysarie gate is the main entrance of the bazaar.

History
It was originally constructed during the 11th century, on the southwest wing of Jameh Mosque and Kohneh Square but various arcades and rooms were later added to it. The present remnant dates from the Safavid period, during which the Qaysariya Bazaar was built on the north wing of Naqsh-e Jahan Square, a square which was developed as a substitute for Kohneh Square.

The bazaar, one of the oldest and largest bazaars in the Middle East, dates to Saljuqid and Safavid era and is the longest roofed market in the world.  The site has been destroyed several times and the contemporary bazaar dates to the 17th century. The bazaar is a vaulted two-kilometre street linking the old city with the new.

In the Middle-East, bazaars were typically situated in close proximity to the mosque and the Isfahan Bazaar is no exception. The Bazaar of Isfahan is located in downtown old Isfahan, Iran, in the northern section of the Naqsh-e Jahan Square. The main entrance called Qeisarieh stretches through to the Friday mosque Jameh Mosque the oldest mosque in Isfahan, and one of the oldest in Iran.

Before entering the Grand Bazaar visitors can see views of the square, which is one of the biggest squares in the entire world. All around the square are bazaars full of Persian handicrafts.

See also
List of the historical structures in the Isfahan province

References

Bibliography
 A. Bakhtiar: ‘The Royal Bazaar of Isfahan’, Studies on Isfahan, ed. R. Holod, 2 vols, Iran. Stud., vii (1974), pp. 320–47
 H. Gaube and E. Wirth: Der Bazar von Isfahan (Wiesbaden, 1978)

External links

Iran Chamber Society on Architecture of the Bazaar at Isfahan

Buildings and structures completed in the 10th century
Buildings and structures in Isfahan
Architecture in Iran
Isfahan
Tourist attractions in Isfahan
17th-century mosques